Dolmen Music is a 1981 studio album by American composer and vocalist Meredith Monk. Recorded in March 1980 and January 1981, it was released on the ECM New Series label. The recording is Monk's first of 12 recordings with the ECM record label.

DJ Shadow sampled "Dolmen Music" on the track "Midnight in a Perfect World" from Endtroducing..... (1996).

NME named it as the 42nd best album of 1981. In 2017, NPR placed it at number 147 on its list of the "150 Greatest Albums Made by Women".

Track listing

Personnel
Credits adapted from the liner notes.
 Meredith Monk — voice, piano
 Collin Walcott — percussion (tracks 1-4), violin (tracks 1-4)
 Steve Lockwood — piano (track 3)
 Andrea Goodman — voice (track 5)
 Monika Solem — voice (track 5)
 Paul Langland — voice (track 5)
 Robert Een — voice (track 5), cello (track 5)
 Julius Eastman — voice (track 5), percussion (track 5)

References

External links
 

1981 albums
ECM New Series albums
Meredith Monk albums
Albums produced by Manfred Eicher